Anna Konstantinovna Shokhina (born 23 June 1997) is a Russian ice hockey player and captain of the Tornado Dmitrov in the Zhenskaya Hockey League (ZhHL). She has been a member of the Russian national team since 2014.

At age 17, Shokhina represented Russia in the women's ice hockey tournament at the 2014 Winter Olympics. She scored a goal against Japan in a 6–3 victory and ended the competition with 1 goal and 3 assists. After the Russian team was banned from participation in the 2018 Winter Olympics, Shokhina opted to join the Olympic Athletes from Russia team in order to play in the women's ice hockey tournament.

References

External links

1997 births
Living people
Ice hockey players at the 2014 Winter Olympics
Ice hockey players at the 2018 Winter Olympics
Ice hockey players at the 2022 Winter Olympics
Russian women's ice hockey forwards
Olympic ice hockey players of Russia
Universiade medalists in ice hockey
People from Dmitrovsky District, Moscow Oblast
Universiade gold medalists for Russia
Competitors at the 2015 Winter Universiade
Competitors at the 2017 Winter Universiade
Competitors at the 2019 Winter Universiade
HC Tornado players
Sportspeople from Moscow Oblast